Hubbertville is a rural incorporated area of Glen Allen located along the west bank of the Sipsey River in north-central Fayette County, Alabama, United States.

Education
Hubbertville School is in Hubbertville.

Notable people
Paul Hubbert, politician, born in Hubbertville

References 

Unincorporated communities in Fayette County, Alabama
Unincorporated communities in Alabama